Hubbard Edwin Northen (August 16, 1886 – October 1, 1947) was an outfielder in  Major League Baseball who played from 1910 through 1912 for the St. Louis Browns, Cincinnati Reds and Brooklyn Dodgers.

Besides, Northen played at Minor League level in all or parts of 16 seasons spanning 1907–1924.

Northeen was the Dodgers regular center fielder  in the 1912 season before being replaced with Casey Stengel when Northen became ill.

In 164 major league games over three seasons, Northern posted a .272 batting average (159-for-584) with 76 runs, 3 home runs and 63 RBIs. He finished his career with a .939 fielding percentage playing at all three outfield positions.

After his retirement as an active player, Northen worked as a scout for various baseball teams, including the Chicago White Sox and the Shreveport Sports of the Texas League.

References

External links

Obituary

1886 births
1947 deaths
Baseball players from Louisiana
Baseball players from Texas
Brooklyn Dodgers players
Chattanooga Lookouts players
Cincinnati Reds players
Fort Worth Panthers players
Houston Buffaloes players
Jersey City Skeeters players
Little Rock Travelers players
Major League Baseball outfielders
Mexia Gushers players
Minor league baseball managers
Mobile Sea Gulls players
Monroe Municipals players
New Orleans Pelicans (baseball) players
Newark Indians players
People from Atlanta, Texas
San Antonio Bronchos players
St. Louis Browns players
Texarkana Twins players
Waco Navigators players